Jack Wilson (28 September 1907 – 12 January 2006) was a British jazz pianist born in Warwickshire, England, probably better known as bandleader of the Versatile Five which he founded in 1933. Before that he worked with Charles Shadwell and also Jack Venables.

References

1907 births
2006 deaths
People from Warwickshire
British jazz pianists
20th-century pianists
20th-century British musicians